Robert Thom (July 2, 1929 – May 8, 1979) was an American writer of films, plays, novels and poems, best known for writing the screenplay for Death Race 2000 (1975), produced by Roger Corman's New World and directed by Paul Bartel.

Early life
Born Robert Flatow in Brooklyn, New York, to parents Lily Pendlebury and Julian Flatow, Thom graduated from Yale University in 1952 and became a Rhodes Scholar where he studied in Oxford for a year.

Career
He sold his first play, The Minotaur, to the Circle in the Square Theatre producers, José Quintero, Ted Mann, Emilie Stevens and Jason Wingreen, in 1954 and went on to establish himself as a young playwriting talent in the New York City theater scene. In 1957, he came to Broadway to work on Compulsion based on the book and play by Meyer Levin about the Leopold and Loeb case. It starred Roddy McDowall and Dean Stockwell and ran for 140 performances but Thom only received an assistant to the producers credit and 20% of Levin's royalties. He later worked on the screenplay for the 1959 film version starring Orson Welles.

He moved to the West Coast to work for MGM and wrote screenplays for youth films such as The Subterraneans, based on the novel by Jack Kerouac, and All the Fine Young Cannibals (both 1960) as well on others uncredited.

He co-wrote an episode of The DuPont Show of the Week ("The Legend of Lylah Clare" 1963) which was broadcast on NBC and later made into a film released in 1968. A week after the broadcast of the DuPont Show he won an Emmy for Outstanding Writing Achievement in Drama for a two-part episode of the TV series The Defenders called The Madman starring Sylvia Sidney and Don Gordon. Bicycle Ride to Nevada starring Franchot Tone opened on Broadway on September 24, 1963 but closed after just one day.

Wild in the Streets, based on a short story written by Thom and originally published in Esquire under the title, "The Day It All Happened, Baby!" was an exploitation film success for American International Pictures in 1968. He directed his only film, Angel, Angel, Down We Go, in 1969 for AIP, which he also wrote.

He also wrote several novels and had just finished Masquerade before his death.

Personal life
He was married to actress Joan Zell from 1953 to 1956; Zell committed suicide at Thom's home in 1961. He married actress Janice Rule in 1956; the couple had one daughter, Kate, before they divorced in 1961. Thom married actress Millie Perkins in 1964; they had two daughters, Hedy and Lillie, and were separated at the time of his death in 1979.

Selected theatre credits
The Minotaur (1954)
Sailing to Byzantium
Compulsion (1957)
Bicycle Ride to Nevada (1963)

Selected Poems
Children of Ladybug
Vaticum

Selected film credits 
Compulsion (1959)
The Subterraneans (1960)
All the Fine Young Cannibals (1960)
Wild in the Streets (1968)
The Legend of Lylah Clare (1968)
Angel, Angel, Down We Go (1969) – also directed
Bloody Mama (1970)
The Phantom of Hollywood (1974)
Alias Big Cherry (1975)
Death Race 2000 (1975)
Crazy Mama (1975)
The Witch Who Came from the Sea (1976)

References

External links 
 
 

American male screenwriters
1929 births
1979 deaths
20th-century American male writers
20th-century American screenwriters